Vila Prudente may refer to:
 Subprefecture of Vila Prudente, São Paulo
 Vila Prudente (district of São Paulo)
 Vila Prudente (São Paulo Metro)